Banco Espírito Santo (BES) was a Portuguese bank based in Lisbon that on 4 August 2014 was split in two banks: Novo Banco, which kept its healthy operations, and a "bad bank" to keep its toxic assets.

It once was the second-largest listed Portuguese bank and the ninth-largest contributor to the PSI-20 index. BES was the second-largest private financial institution in Portugal in terms of net assets (€80,700 million in March 2011), with an average market share of 20.3% in Portugal and 2.1 million clients.

On 3 August 2014, Banco de Portugal, Portugal's central bank, announced a €4.4 billion bailout of BES that heralded the end of BES as a private bank. The bailout was funded by the Portuguese Resolution Fund. The bank was split into a healthy bank, Novo Banco, while the toxic assets remained in the existing bank until its liquidation in July 2016.

It has since been proven that the administration of BES led by Ricardo Salgado "disobeyed the Bank of Portugal 21 times, between December 2013 and July 2014", practising "wilful acts of ruinous management".

History 

Banco Espírito Santo's origins began with the lottery, currency exchange, and securities business carried out by José Maria do Espírito Santo e Silva between 1869 and 1884. The first references to trading that the “patriarch of the only dynasty of Portuguese bankers” was undertaking was in the purchase and sale of lotteries, along with national and international transactions in loan securities, on his own account. This took place in his Casa de Cambio, situated in centre of Lisbon and which dated back to the second half of the 19th century (1869). Since then and until 1920, he founded a number of banking institutions, such as Beirão, Silva Pinto & Cª., (1884–1887), Silva, Beirão, Pinto & Cª. (1897–1911), J. M. Espírito Santo Silva (1911–1915), and J. M. Espírito Santo Silva & Cª. (1915).

In 1915, after the death of José Maria do Espírito Santo e Silva, these firms were dissolved and his heirs founded the Casa Bancária Espírito Santo Silva & Cª, which was transformed into a public limited-liability company in 1920 under the name Banco Espírito Santo with the bank, in this decade, managing to consolidate its position within the context of national banking by opening agencies and using a renewed management model.

In 1937, the bank strengthened its position in commercial banking through a merger with Banco Comercial de Lisboa to form Banco Espírito Santo e Comercial de Lisboa (BESCL), which again changed its name to BES in 1999.

Up to the mid-1970s, BESCL reinforced its international presence with acquisitions, partnerships, and the creation of banks in countries such as the United States, Angola, and the United Kingdom, among others. Under a Decree Law of 1975, the bank was nationalised and the Espírito Santo family was prevented from doing business in Portugal. Within this context, the family re-established its financial interests abroad in countries such as Brazil, Switzerland, France, and the United States, culminating in 1975 with the creation of a holding company based in Luxembourg. This company was the predecessor of the Espírito Santo Financial Group (ESFG).

The return to Portugal began in 1986 in partnership with Crédit Agricole and with the support of a core group of Portuguese shareholders. They formed the Banco Internacional de Crédito (BIC), also forming Espírito Santo Sociedade de Investimentos (ESSI), together with Swiss bank UBS and KBC Bank of Luxembourg.

In 1990, the Espírito Santo Group recovered Companhia de Seguros Tranquilidade — the Espirito Santo family held a stake since 1935 — and the control of Banco Espírito Santo in 1991 with the creation of a holding company between ESFG and Crédit Agricole, called BESPAR.

In 1992, BES began operating in the Spanish market where it created Banco Espírito Santo S.A. and in 1995, to open Banco Espírito Santo do Oriente (BESOR) that offers corporate and investment solutions to private clients. Also, in 2001, Banco Espírito Santo Angola, a bank formed under Angolan law, was founded.

In the first six months of 2014 the bank lost the equivalent of $4.8 billion raising concerns about the health of the bank. BES shares fell by 89 per cent. On 3 August 2014, Portugal's central bank announced BES would be restructured by splitting the bank into two. This announcement, following BES record Q2 loss of €3.49 billion, allowed Portuguese stocks to outperform the broader European market the next day.

Former structure 

BES has had a stable shareholder structure since 1991. The main shareholders, ESFG and Crédit Agricole, hold 50.8% of the capital. The Group's presence today is felt in 23 countries on four continents through branches, offices of representation, or sub-companies, making the Banco Espírito Santo Group the most international of the Portuguese financial groups. Since 2007, BES has been the only Portuguese bank to be included on the sustainability index FTSE4Good Index reinforcing its positioning as a socially responsible institution. On 3 January 2011, BES was nominated "Best Trade Financial Bank" in Portugal for the fifth consecutive year by Global Finance magazine.

See also

Cardmobili
Espírito Santo Financial Group
Inter-Alpha Group of Banks

References

Bank failures
Defunct banks of Portugal
Banks established in 1869
Banks disestablished in 2014
1869 establishments in Portugal